The 2010 FIA Alternative Energies Cup was a season of the FIA Alternative Energies Cup, a world championship for vehicles with alternative energy propulsion organized by the Fédération Internationale de l'Automobile. The season consisted of ten rallies, beginning with Rally Montecarlo on 25 March, and ended with Ecorally San Marino - Città del Vaticano on 22 October.

France's Raymond Durand won the Drivers championship, his second consecutive title, and Toyota secured their fourth Manufacturers' title.

Calendar and winners

Driver Standings

Manufacturer Standings

References

FIA E-Rally Regularity Cup seasons
Fia Alternative Energies Cup